Habenaria microceras is a species of plant in the family Orchidaceae. It is found in Cameroon and Equatorial Guinea. Its natural habitat is subtropical or tropical dry forests.

References

microceras
Near threatened plants
Orchids of Cameroon
Orchids of Equatorial Guinea
Taxonomy articles created by Polbot
Taxa named by Joseph Dalton Hooker